Azatrephes orientalis is a moth of the subfamily Arctiinae. It is found in Brazil.

References

Phaegopterina
Moths of South America
Moths described in 1922